Protopliomerella is an extinct genus of trilobite in the family Pliomeridae. There is one described species in Protopliomerella, P. contracta.

References

Pliomeridae
Articles created by Qbugbot